The women's 3000 metres speed skating competition of the Vancouver 2010 Olympics was held at Richmond Olympic Oval on 14 February 2010.

Records
Prior to this competition, the existing world and Olympic records were as follows.

No new world or Olympic records were set during this competition.

Results

Notes and references

External links
2010 Winter Olympics results: Ladies' 3000 m, from http://www.vancouver2010.com/; retrieved 2010-02-13.

Women's speed skating at the 2010 Winter Olympics